Islam in Guinea-Bissau is the predominant religion of the country, numbering an estimated 70% of its roughly 1.4 million citizens are followers. The vast majority approximately 92% are Sunni of Maliki school of jurisprudence, with Sufi influences. Approximately 6% Shia and 2% Ahmadiyya are also present.

See also
Ahmadiyya in Guinea-Bissau

References